Grasa is a Spanish dramedy streaming television series written and directed by  which stars Kike Pérez in the leading role. Produced by RTVE and  Entertainment, it premiered on Playz in 2020.

Premise 
Set in Seville, the fiction follows the life of Pedro Marrero, aka "El Grasa", an overweight criminal with an unhealthy lifestyle who suffers from a heart attack and then decides to radically change his life in order to improve on his health condition and stay alive.

Cast

Production and release 
Produced by RTVE in collaboration with  Entertainment, shooting of the first season took place in Seville in 2019. Consisting of 6 episodes featuring a running time of around 25 minutes, the series debuted on Playz on 12 May 2020. With around 2,600,000 reproductions of season 1, filming of season 2 had already started in March 2021. It took place in between Dos Hermanas and Matalascañas. RTVE set the release date of the full 6-episode season 2 for 27 September 2021.

References

External links 
 Grasa on RTVE Play

Obesity in television
2020 Spanish television series debuts
2020s Spanish comedy television series
2020s Spanish drama television series
Television shows set in Seville
Television shows filmed in Spain
Spanish comedy-drama television series
Spanish-language television shows
Playz original programming
RTVE Play original programming